Shen Qing is a lifestyle and fashion publisher in China, writing weekly, monthly magazine or blog articles  with a following in a number of Chinese foreign joint venture publications. She also serves as publisher of the Chinese edition of the monthly How to Spend It column of the Financial Times. Her previous publishing career includes associate publisher of Life Magazine.

A law department graduate of Peking University, Shen went to the United States for her graduate study in the San Francisco Bay Area of California. She was briefly in mainstream American news when her activist younger brother Shen Tong was arrested in China in 1992. The two have been in media ventures together including VFinity

References

Sources
 FT launches magazine for China's wealthy
 Bride Magazine Profile in China on Shen Qing
 Fortune Small Business (FSB) A Tiananmen Rebel turns Capitalist

People's Republic of China journalists
Chinese magazine publishers (people)
Chinese magazine writers
Living people
Year of birth missing (living people)
20th-century Chinese women writers
20th-century Chinese writers
21st-century Chinese women writers
21st-century Chinese writers